Aśvaghoṣa is an impact crater on Mercury, 90 kilometers in diameter. It is located at 10.4°, 21°W, south of the crater Abu Nuwas and southwest of the crater Molière. It is a nearly circular formation, and its rim remains intact, except where it is broken at its southern side, and at its northern side by an indentation from two conjoined craterlets. On the crater floor is a central mountain that rises to multiple peaks. The crater is named for Indian philosopher and poet Aśvaghoṣa, and its name was adopted by the International Astronomical Union in 1976.

References

Impact craters on Mercury